Lieutenant-General Edmund Archibald Osborne CB DSO (1885–1969) was a British Army officer who commanded II Corps during the Second World War.

Military career
Osborne entered the Royal Military Academy, Woolwich and was commissioned as a second lieutenant into the Royal Engineers, British Army, in 1904. He served in the First World War, where, in September 1914, he was awarded the Distinguished Service Order, with the citation reading:

He continued to serve with distinction during the war, being mentioned in dispatches eight times.

With the war over in November 1918, he then attended the Staff College, Camberley, from 1921 to 1922 and later became Commander of the School of Signals in 1926.

He went on to be a general staff officer (GSO) with the 3rd Infantry Division in 1930. Osborne subsequently became Commander of 157th (Highland Light Infantry) Brigade in 1933 and Commander of the Cairo Brigade in Egypt in 1934.

He served in the Second World War, initially as General Officer Commanding (GOC) 44th (Home Counties) Division from April 1938 and then as GOC II Corps from 1940 until he retired from the British Army in 1941.

References

Bibliography

External links
Generals of World War II

|-

1885 births
1969 deaths
British Army generals of World War II
British Army personnel of World War I
Companions of the Order of the Bath
Companions of the Distinguished Service Order
Royal Corps of Signals officers
Royal Engineers officers
Graduates of the Royal Military Academy, Woolwich
Graduates of the Staff College, Camberley
British Army lieutenant generals